Nathaniel "Jack" O'Brien (9 June 1906 – 21 February 1970) was an Australian rules footballer who played with South Melbourne and Hawthorn in the Victorian Football League (VFL).

Notes

External links 

1906 births
1970 deaths
Australian rules footballers from Victoria (Australia)
Sydney Swans players
Hawthorn Football Club players